Burgoberbach is a municipality in the district of Ansbach in Bavaria in Germany.

In the graveyard of the Catholic church of St. Leonhard lies the grave of Flying Officer George Warren, administered by the Commonwealth War Graves Commission.

References

External links

  

Ansbach (district)